The Antonia Sáez School (Spanish: Escuela Antonia Sáez) is a former school located in Humacao, Puerto Rico. The Mission/Spanish Revival school building was added to the United States National Register of Historic Places in 1995. The structure also served as a marketplace (plaza del mercado) between 1966 and 2004.

References 

National Register of Historic Places in Humacao, Puerto Rico
School buildings on the National Register of Historic Places in Puerto Rico
1922 establishments in Puerto Rico
School buildings completed in 1922